Kohneh (also known as ‘Alīābād, ‘Alīābād-e Kohneh, Kahneh ‘Alīābād, Kahneh-ye ‘Alīābād, and Kohneh ‘Alīābād) is a village in Howmeh Rural District, in the Central District of Larestan County, Fars Province, Iran. At the 2006 census, its population was 619, in 137 families.

References 

Populated places in Larestan County